Nardis is an album by jazz guitarist Jimmy Raney with his son, Doug Raney, that was released in 1983 by SteepleChase.

Track listing 
 "There Will Never Be Another You" (Harry Warren, Mack Gordon) – 5:46
 "I Can't Get Started" (Vernon Duke, Ira Gershwin) – 10:11
 "All God's Chillun Got Rhythm" (Walter Jurmann, Gus Kahn, Bronisław Kaper) – 6:01
 "What's New?" (Bob Haggart, Johnny Burke) – 6:38
 "Nardis" (Miles Davis) – 7:05
 "Easy to Love" (Cole Porter) – 6:21
 "Canon" (Jimmy Raney) – 5:17 Bonus track on CD reissue

Personnel 
Jimmy Raney – guitar
Doug Raney – guitar

References 

Doug Raney albums
Jimmy Raney albums
1983 albums
SteepleChase Records albums